Daga , also officially referred to as Dagana, is a town in Goshi Gewog,  Dagana District in southwestern Bhutan. It is the administrative capital,  Dzongkhag Thromde, of the district.

In 2005, Daga had a population of 1,146.

References

External links
Satellite map at Maplandia.com

Populated places in Bhutan
Dagana District